Fred Hynes (May 8, 1908 – February 10, 1992) was an American sound engineer. He won five Academy Awards in the category Sound Recording and was nominated for two more in the same category.

Selected filmography
Hynes won five Academy Awards and was nominated for two more:

Won
 Oklahoma! (1955)
 South Pacific (1958)
 The Alamo (1960)
 West Side Story (1961)
 The Sound of Music (1965)

Nominated
 Porgy and Bess (1959)
 Cleopatra (1963)

References

External links

1908 births
1992 deaths
American audio engineers
People from Nashville, Tennessee
Best Sound Mixing Academy Award winners
Recipients of the John A. Bonner Medal of Commendation
Recipients of the Gordon E. Sawyer Award
20th-century American engineers